Cyanagapanthia is a genus of longhorn beetles of the subfamily Lamiinae, containing the following species:

 Cyanagapanthia aurecens Wang & Zheng, 2002
 Cyanagapanthia bicolor Breuning, 1968

References

Lamiini